David Ausberry (born September 25, 1987) is a former American football tight end. He played college football for the University of Southern California.

High school career
Ausberry was considered one of the top wide receiver prospects in the country at Lemoore High School. His senior year, he caught 55 passes for 930 yards and 13 touchdowns. He was later invited to play in the 2006 U.S. Army All-American Bowl.

College career
Ausberry played college football at Southern California. After redshirting in 2006 Ausberry would go on to be a productive member of the Trojan team for the next 4 years. In that time he logged 64 receptions for 700 yards as well as 7 touchdowns. He also rushed for 14 yards on two attempts in 2010. At 6'4, 243 lbs., Ausberry ran an impressive 4.48 40-yard dash at the NFL Combine.

Professional career

Oakland Raiders
Ausberry was selected by the Oakland Raiders with the 241st overall pick in the 2011 NFL Draft and converted to tight end. He played sparingly during his rookie year, and finished the 2011 season with two catches, while excelling on special teams with seven coverage tackles in twelve games.

Detroit Lions
Ausberry signed with the Detroit Lions on June 10, 2015. He was released by the team on August 18, 2015.

Career statistics

References

External links

Oakland Raiders bio 
USC Trojans bio

1987 births
Living people
American football tight ends
American football wide receivers
USC Trojans football players
Oakland Raiders players
Detroit Lions players
Players of American football from Virginia
People from Strasburg, Virginia
People from Lemoore, California